The 1916 Zoning Resolution in New York City  was the first citywide zoning code in the United States. The zoning resolution reflected both borough and local interests, and was proposed after the Equitable Building was erected in Lower Manhattan in 1915. 

The resolution was a measure adopted primarily to stop massive buildings from preventing light and air from reaching the streets below, and established limits in building massing at certain heights, usually interpreted as a series of setbacks and, while not imposing height limits, restricted towers to 25% of the lot size. The chief authors of this resolution were George McAneny and Edward M. Bassett.

Impact

The 1916 Zoning Resolution had a major impact on urban development in both the United States and internationally. Architectural delineator Hugh Ferriss popularized these new regulations in 1922 through a series of massing studies, clearly depicting the possible forms and how to maximize building volumes. "By the end of the 1920s the setback skyscraper, originally built in response to a New York zoning code, became a style that caught on from Chicago to Shanghai," observe Eric Peter Nash and Norman McGrath, discussing the Williamsburgh Savings Bank Building, which rose in isolation in Brooklyn, where no such zoning dictated form.  The tiered Art Deco skyscrapers of the 1920s and 1930s are a direct result of this resolution.

Legacy
By the mid-century most new International Style buildings had met the setback requirements by adopting the use of plazas or low-rise buildings surrounding a monolithic tower centered on the site. This approach was often criticized.

The New York City Department of City Planning passed the 1961 Zoning Resolution in October 1960, and the new zoning rules became effective in December 1961, superseding the 1916 Zoning Resolution. The new zoning solution used the Floor Area Ratio (FAR) regulation instead of setback rules. A building's maximum floor area is regulated according to the ratio that was imposed to the site where the building is located. Another feature of new zoning solution was adjacent public open space. If developers put adjacent public open space to their buildings, they could get additional area for their building as a bonus. This incentive bonus rule was created because of the strong influence from two representative skyscrapers. The Seagram Building by Mies van der Rohe with Philip Johnson, and Lever House by Skidmore, Owings & Merrill, introduced the new ideas about office building with open space. These buildings changed the skyline of New York City with both the advent of simple glass box design and their treatment of adjacent open spaces. The new zoning encouraged privately owned public space to ease the density of the city.

See also 
 The Standard State Zoning Enabling Act

References

Further reading
Ferriss, Hugh. The Metropolis of Tomorrow, with essay by Carol Willis. New York: Princeton Architectural Press, 1986. Reprint of 1929 edition. .

External links
NYC Zoning History
in-arch.net THE 1916 ZONING REGULATIONS - AND ONWARD

Real property law in the United States
Urban planning in New York City
Zoning in the United States
Zoning Resolution